'Ushsh el-Ghurab is a hill located just north of Jericho in the West Bank. Its peak is  relative to sea level, although it still rises appreciably above the still lower Plain of Jericho around it. Separated from the Mount of Temptation by the Wadi ed-Duyuk and the village and refugee camp of 'Ein ed-Duyuk el-Foqa, it was formerly identified as the location of part of Jesus's Temptation by the Devil.

Name
Jebel ʿUshsh el-Ghurāb is Palestinian Arabic for "Mountain of the Nest of the Raven" or, idiomatically, "of the Mushroom". It has also been variously transcribed as 'Ush Ghurab, Ush el Ghurab, 'Osh el Ghūrâb, and Jabal ʿUshsh al Ghurāb.

Legend
As late as the 19th century, the nearby waditoday the Wadi 'Ushsh el-Ghurabwas known as the "Wadi of the Ascent of Jesus" (Wadi Mesāʾadet ʾAīsa). This preserved the local Arab legend that it was the summit of 'Ushsh el-Ghurab, rather than the nearby Mount of Temptation, where Jesus had been taken by the Devil to be offered dominion over all the kingdoms of the world.

References

Citations

Bibliography

 .
 .
 .
 .
 .
 .
 .

Mythological places
Mountains of the West Bank
New Testament mountains
Temptation of Christ